The Pacoh language is a member of the Katuic language group, a part of the Eastern  Mon–Khmer linguistic branch. Most Pacoh speakers live in central Laos and central Vietnam. Pacoh is undergoing substantial change, influenced by the Vietnamese.

Alternative names are Paco, Pokoh, Bo River Van Kieu. Its dialects are Pahi (Ba-Hi). They are officially classified by the Vietnamese government as Ta'Oi (Tà Ôi) people.

Phonology
Vowels (Sidwell 2003):

Pacoh has six vowel qualities, all of which occur long and short, in modal and creaky voice. Creaky vowels are lowered compared to modally voiced vowels. There are three diphthongs which also occur modal and creaky. Unlike other languages in the area, vowel phonation does not seem to have originated in the phonation of preceding consonants.

Further reading
 Alves, M. J. (2006). A grammar of Pacoh: a Mon–Khmer language of the central highlands of Vietnam. Pacific linguistics, 580. Canberra: Pacific Linguistics, Research School of Pacific and Asian Studies, the Australian National University. 
Watson, Richard L. (1964). "Pacoh Phonemes". Mon-Khmer Studies Journal.

References

External links
Alves, Mark J. 2007. Pacoh Pronouns and Grammaticalization Clines.
A grammar of Pacoh: A Mon–Khmer language of the central highlands of Vietnam
The language has these sounds
Pacoh-English-Vietnamese dictionary by SIL International

Katuic languages